The 6.5×58mm Vergueiro is a centerfire rimless cartridge designed in 1904 specifically for the Mauser-Vergueiro, chosen as service rifle of the Portuguese Army. It was adopted to replace the rimmed 8×60mmR Guedes and 8×56mmR Kropatschek Corto cartridges originally filled with blackpowder, which had been used with Kropatschek rifles procured in the mid-1880s. Smokeless powder allowed for a higher velocity round and further calibre reduction to 6.5 mm, a step already taken by other European countries, e.g. Sweden (6.5×55mm Swedish) and Italy (6.5×52mm Carcano).

It remained the service rifle cartridge until the Karabiner 98k replaced the Mauser-Vergueiro pattern in 1939. The round was also used for sporting purposes, manufacturers like DWM and Kynoch offered it until the 1960s.

A lot of the Mauser-Vergueiro rifles were later rechambered to accept the standard 7.92×57mm cartridge of the newer Mauser 98k pattern.

See also 
 6 mm caliber
 6.5×55mm Swedish
 6.5×52mm Carcano
 List of rifle cartridges
 Table of handgun and rifle cartridges

References

Pistol and rifle cartridges
Military cartridges